Kamal Saleh (also Romanized as Kamāl Şāleḩ; also known as Kamān-e Şāleḩī) is a village in Hendudur Rural District, Sarband District, Shazand County, Markazi Province, Iran. At the 2006 census, its population was 37, in 8 families.

References 

Populated places in Shazand County